Bolokhovians,  Bolokhoveni, also Bolokhovens (Old Slavic: Болоховци, Bolokhovtsy), were a 13th-century ethnic group that resided in the vicinity of the Rus' principalities of Halych, Volhynia and Kiev, in the territory known as the "" centered at the city of Bolokhov or Bolokhovo (not identified yet). Their ethnic identity is uncertain; although Romanian scholars, basing on their ethnonym identify them as Romanians (who were called Vlachs in the Middle Ages), archeological evidence and the Hypatian Chronicle (which is the only primary source that documents their history) suggest that they were a Slavic people. Their princes, or knyazes, were in constant conflict with Daniel of Galicia, Prince of Halych and Volhynia, between 1231 and 1257. After the Mongols sacked Kiev in 1240, the Bolokhovians supplied them with troops, but the Bolokhovian princes fled to Poland. The Bolokhovians disappeared after Daniel defeated them in 1257.

Etymology 

Romanian scholars suggest that the name "Bolokhoveni" may have derived from Voloch, the East Slavic term for Romanians, or Vlachs. If this theory is correct, the Bolokhoveni were Romanians living in the western regions of Kievan Rus'. However this theory is contradicted by archaeological evidence, which indicates that the Bolokhovian material culture resembled that of its contemporaries in the western parts of Kievan Rus'. Furthermore, it is documented that the Bolokhovian princes had family ties with boyars of the Principality of Halych.

The ethnonym seems to be connected to the name Bolokhovo, an early medieval settlement that the Hypatian Chroniclean accurate source of the history of Kievan Rus'mentioned around 1150. According to historian Victor Spinei, this town may have been the same town as Borokhov, which was recorded by the same chronicle in 1172. Alternatively, Spinei states, Bolokhovo may be the same town as Bolechow (now Bolekhiv, Ukraine), which was mentioned as the "town called 'the Vlachs in a Polish charter from 1472.

Geography 

The Hypatian Chronicle refers to the "" once. Based on the chronicle, modern historians say that this land bordered the principalities of Halych, Volhynia and Kiev. Bozhskyy, along with other Bolokhovian towns mentioned in the chronicle, were situated along the Buzhok and Sluch rivers. According to the Encyclopedia of Ukraine, the Bolokhovians inhabited the region around the sources of the Teteriv, Boh, Horyn and Sluch rivers.

On the other hand, historian Alexandru V. Boldur believes that the Bolokhovian Land was located between the Dniester and Dnieper rivers. He also says that the Bolokhoveni were located southeast of the present-day town of Ushitsa.

According to Niketas Choniates's chronicle, "the Vlachs, who had heard rumors" of the escape of Andronikos Komnenus (a rebellious cousin of the Byzantine Emperor Manuel I), captured him in 1164 at the borders of Halych.

History 
The Hypatian Chronicle first refers to "Bolokhovian princes" when documenting a war between Daniil Romanovich, Prince of Halych and Volhynia, and the Hungarians in 1231. The Bolokhovian princes fought in alliance with the Hungarians. The Bolokhovian princes supported a rebellion against Daniil Romanovich, and they besieged an important stronghold, Kamianets-Podilskyi, in 1233 or 1235. However, the princes were captured and brought to the court of Daniil Romanovich in Vladimir. When Mikhail, Prince of Chernigov, and Iziaslav, Prince of Novgorod-Seversk, requested their release, they referred to Bolokhovian princes as their "brothers".

After the Mongols destroyed Kiev in 1240, the Mongols moving westward did not attack the "Bolokhovian Land". However, they did force the Bolokhovians to supply their army with crops. At the same time, the Bolokhovian princes fled to the Duchy of Masovia (now in Poland). They promised Duke Bolesław I of Masovia that they would accept his suzerainty, but the duke captured them. They were released after Daniil Romanovich and his brother, Vasilko Romanovich, promised to give Duke Bolesław I many gifts.

The Mongol invasion of Rus' did not end the conflicts among the local rulers. The Bolokhovian princes supported Rostislav Mikhailovich when he besieged Bakota, a major town held by Daniil Romanovich's officials, in 1241. In revenge for the attack, Daniil Romanovich invaded and pillaged the Bolokhovian Land and destroyed their fortified towns. Archaeological research at Gubin and Kudin, two supposedly Bolokhovian towns, shows that the town walls were dug up by Daniil's army. However, no corpses or traces of fire were found, implying that Daniil took the towns' inhabitants to his own principality. Their defeat by Daniil's troops in 1257 was the last recorded event of the history of the Bolokhovians.

See also 
Blakumen

References

Sources

Further reading 

The Hypatian Codex II: The Galician-Volynian Chronicle (An annotated translation by George A. Perfecky) (1973). Wilhelm Fink Verlag.

Eastern Romance people
Bolokhovians
Medieval Ukraine
12th century in Ukraine
13th century in Ukraine
13th century in Kievan Rus'